The 1977 Southeastern Conference baseball tournament was held at Swayze Field in Oxford, Mississippi, from May 13 through 16.  won the tournament and earned the Southeastern Conference's automatic bid to the 1977 NCAA Tournament.

The 1977 tournament was the first baseball tournament held by the SEC. It has been held every year since.

Regular season results

Tournament

See also 
 College World Series
 NCAA Division I Baseball Championship
 Southeastern Conference baseball tournament

References 

 SECSports.com All-Time Baseball Tournament Results
 SECSports.com All-Tourney Team Lists

Southeastern Conference Baseball Tournament
Tournament
Southeastern Conference baseball tournament
Southeastern Conference baseball tournament
College sports tournaments in Mississippi
History of Lafayette County, Mississippi
Baseball competitions in Mississippi
Sports in Oxford, Mississippi